Vancho Shontevski is a Director of the Military Service for Security and Intelligence of Army of the Republic of Macedonia  of Macedonia.

References

Living people
Macedonian politicians
Year of birth missing (living people)
People from Berovo